Sucunduri River is a river of Amazonas state in north-western Brazil, one of the main headwaters of the Canumã River.

Course

The Sucunduri River rises in the  Sucunduri State Park in the municipality of Apuí.
The Monte Cristo rapids on the Sucunduri is an area with great numbers and diversity of animals and birds.
In 2006 it was also the location of an illegal mining settlement.
The Monte Cristo rapids and the Sucunduri River Falls (Saltos do Rio Sucunduri) are well-known attractions.

The river flows through the  Acari National Park created by president Dilma Rousseff in 2016 in the last week before her provisional removal from office.
Part of the river's basin is in the  Juruena National Park, one of the largest conservation units in Brazil.
The Sucunduri basin occupies 10% of the park.
The Trans-Amazonian Highway crosses the Sucunduri River.
Further north it merges with the Acari and the downstream section is known as the Canumã River. 
When treated as a single river, it is known as the Canumã-Sucunduri.

See also
List of rivers of Amazonas

References

Sources

Rivers of Amazonas (Brazilian state)